Ralph Zondag is a Canadian animator, storyboard artist, and director.

Life and career 
Zondag studied animation at Sheridan College, Ontario, Canada from 1983 to 1984.

He started his career at the Toronto-based Nelvana studio in working on projects like The Care Bears Movie (1985).  He later joined Sullivan Bluth Studios in Ireland and worked as animation director on The Land Before Time (1988), in which he animated the characters Petrie and the Sharptooth, and All Dogs Go to Heaven (1989). He also directed television commercials while working at Sullivan Bluth. In 1993, he made his directorial debut for We're Back! A Dinosaur's Story based on the book of the same name, along with his brother Dick.

Zondag joined Walt Disney Feature Animation during the early 1990s and co-wrote Pocahontas in 1995. In 2000, he and Eric Leighton directed Dinosaur as a part of the Disney Computer Graphics Unit. Zondag was nominated for Annie Award for Outstanding Individual Achievement for Directing in an Animated Feature Production.

He worked on projects such as Rugrats Go Wild (2003), Home on the Range (2004), Balto III: Wings of Change (2004), Valiant (2005), and Curious George (2006). Zondag worked as storyboard artist on Ultimate Avengers 2, Flushed Away (2006), The Golden Compass (2007), and Kung Fu Panda (2008). He worked the 3-D animated features Meet the Robinsons (2007) and Bolt (2008). Zondag also created concept art during the pre-production of Tangled (2010).

His most recent credits are the educational TV series Space Racers and the Christian-themed film The Star.

Filmography

Animation department
 The Star (character designer) 2017
 Space Racers (TV Series) (storyboard supervisor - 6 episodes) 2016-2017
 NFL Rush Zone (TV Series) (storyboard artist - 4 episodes) 2013
 Superbook (TV Series) (revisions - 1 episode, 2013) (Revisions - 1 episode, 2013)
 Bolt (animator) 2008
 Curious George (animator: July Films) 2006
 Valiant (character developer) 2005
 Rugrats Go Wild (additional animator) 2003
 All Dogs Go to Heaven (directing animator) 1989
 The Land Before Time (directing animator) 1988 
 An American Tail (animator) 1986
 Strawberry Shortcake Meets the Berrykins (TV movie) (animator) 1985
 Ewoks (character layout artist - 13 episodes) 1985
 Star Wars: Droids (character posing artist - 13 episodes) 1985
 The Care Bears Movie (animator) 1985

Art department
 Space Racers (TV Series) (storyboard artist - 11 episodes, 2014–2018) (storyboard supervisor - 1 episode, 2017)
 Barbie: Dolphin Magic (storyboard artist) 2017
 Animal Crackers (storyboard artist) 2017
 Peter Rabbit (TV Series) (storyboards - 9 episodes) 2012-2013
 Dragons: Riders of Berk (TV Series) (storyboard artist - 3 episodes) 2012-2013
 Archer (TV Series) (storyboard artist - 13 episodes) 2011-2012
 The Little Mermaid: Ariel's Beginning (storyboard artist) 2008
 Ultimate Avengers II (storyboard artist) 2006
 The Adventures of Brer Rabbit (Video) (storyboard artist) 2006
 Bionicle 3: Web of Shadows (storyboard artist) 2005
 Father of the Pride (storyboard artist - 1 episode) 2004
 Mickey's Twice Upon a Christmas (storyboard artist) 2004
 Balto III: Wings of Change (storyboard artist) 2004
 Mickey, Donald, Goofy: The Three Musketeers (storyboard artist) 2004
 Clifford's Puppy Days (TV Series) (storyboard artist - 1 episode) 2004
 A Troll in Central Park (storyboard artist) 1994
 Rock-A-Doodle (storyboard artist) 1991

Director
 Dinosaur 2000
 We're Back! A Dinosaur's Story 1993

Miscellaneous crew
 Superbook (TV series) (revisions - 2 episodes, 2013 - 2014) (Revisions - 1 episode, 2013) 2013-2014
 Rock-A-Doodle (sequence director) 1991

Writer
 The Little Matchgirl (Short) (story development) 2006
 Home on the Range (additional story) 2004
 Dinosaur (story) 2000
 Pocahontas (story) 1995

References

External links

Year of birth missing (living people)
Living people
Canadian animated film directors
Canadian storyboard artists
Walt Disney Animation Studios people
Canadian expatriates in the United States